is the fourth major single (seventh overall) released by Japanese pop rock band Scandal. The title track is an answer song to Hillbilly Bops' 1988 song "Yumemiru Koro wo Sugitemo". It was also used as the October 2009 opening theme for NTV's "Ongaku Senshi Music Fighter". The first B-side, "BEAUTeen!!", also received promotion as a radio single. The second B-side, "Daydream", is a Judy and Mary cover that was previously released on a tribute album for their fifteenth anniversary. The single reached #12 on the Oricon weekly chart and charted for three weeks, selling 7,450 copies.

Track listing

References 

2009 singles
Scandal (Japanese band) songs
Epic Records singles